Olsztyn Allenstein

Town quarters

Anielska Górka Engelsberg
Augustówka Augustthal
Dajtki Deuthen
Grądek Thalberg
Gutkowo Göttkendorf
Jakubowo Jakobsberg
Jaroty Jomendorf
Jędrzejówka Andreasberg
Kortowo Kortau
Likusy Likusen
Łupstych Abstich
Nagórki Bergenthal
Niedźwiedź Bärenbruch
Perszkowo Pörschkau
Pieczewo Stolzenberg
Pozorty Posorten
Redykajny Redigkainen
Starkowo Stärkenthal
Stary Dwór Althof
Wadąg Wadang
Zielona Górka Grünberg

Lakes and rivers

Jezioro Długie Lang - See
Jezioro Kortowskie Kort - See
Jezioro Skanda Skanda - See
Jezioro Sukiel Suckel - See
Jezioro Track Trautziger - See
Jezioro Ukiel/Krzywe Okull - See
Jezioro Wadąg Wadang - See
Rzeka Łyna Alle - Fluß
Rzeka Wadąg Wadang - Fluß

See also 
List of German exonyms for places in Poland
German exonyms (Warmia)

Olsztyn
Olsztyn